Kathrine Maaseide (born 18 December 1976, in Stavanger) is a female professional beach volleyball player from Norway, who represented her native country at the 2004 Summer Olympics in Athens, Greece. Partnering Susanne Glesnes she claimed the silver medal at the 2004 European Championships in Timmendorfer Strand, Germany. Sister of professional beach volleyball player Bjørn Maaseide.

References

1976 births
Living people
Norwegian beach volleyball players
Women's beach volleyball players
Beach volleyball players at the 2004 Summer Olympics
Beach volleyball players at the 2008 Summer Olympics
Olympic beach volleyball players of Norway
Sportspeople from Stavanger